The Class E 50 is an electric heavy freight locomotive built for German Federal Railways between 1957 and 1973. It belongs to the Einheits-Elektrolokomotiven (standardised electric locomotives) program and was built as a heavy freight mover to be used on the increasingly electrified main lines of the DB, where they were set to replace the steam traction. In 1968 the series was redesignated as class 150 (E50). Originally the Class 150 was also suitable for passenger service; however, it did not have any steam or electric heating capability for the passenger coaches.

Production
In 1957 the first locomotive, 150 001, was delivered by AEG and Krupp. Altogether, 194 locomotives were ordered and delivered.

Performance
To date, the Class 150's starting tractive effort of  remains unparalleled on German rails. In fact, it was very close to the breaking force of the buffers and chain couplers used at the time of its production. Some engines were therefore fitted with automatic coupling (type unicupler AK69e) to haul heavy ore-trains.

Survivors
By 2004 all class 150 locomotives except 150 091 and 150 186 were scrapped.

Electric locomotives of Germany
15 kV AC locomotives
150
Co′Co′ locomotives
AEG locomotives
Brown, Boveri & Cie locomotives
Siemens locomotives
Henschel locomotives
Krauss-Maffei locomotives
Krupp locomotives
Railway locomotives introduced in 1957
Standard gauge locomotives of Germany
Co′Co′ electric locomotives of Europe

Freight locomotives